The 2007 Tim Hortons Brier, Canada's men's curling championship, was held from March 3 to 11 at Copps Coliseum in Hamilton, Ontario. After losing in the final the previous season, Team Ontario skipped by Glenn Howard defeated 2006 Olympic gold medalist Brad Gushue and his Newfoundland and Labrador team in the final.

Teams

Round-robin standings
Final round-robin standings

Round-robin results

Draw 1
Saturday, March 3, 14:30

Draw 2
Saturday, March 3, 19:00

Draw 3
Sunday, March 4, 9:00

Draw 4
Sunday, March 4, 14:30

Draw 5
Sunday, March 4, 19:00

Draw 6
Monday, March 5, 9:00

Draw 7
Monday, March 5, 14:30

Draw 8
Monday, March 5, 19:30

Draw 9
Tuesday, March 6, 9:00

Draw 10
Tuesday, March 6, 14:30

Draw 11
Tuesday, March 6, 19:30

Draw 12
Wednesday, March 7, 9:00

Draw 13
Wednesday, March 7, 14:30

Draw 14
Wednesday, March 7, 19:00

Draw 15
Thursday, March 8, 9:00

Draw 16
Thursday, March 8, 14:30

Draw 17
Thursday, March 8, 19:30

Playoffs
The Page playoff system is used at the Brier. The top four teams with the best records at the end of round-robin play meet in the playoff rounds. The first and second place teams play each other, with the winner advancing directly to the final. The winner of the other page playoff game between the third and fourth place teams plays the loser of the first/second playoff game in the semi-final. The winner of the semi-final moves on to the final.

3 vs. 4 
Friday, March 9, 14:30

1 vs. 2 
Friday, March 9, 19:30

Semifinal
Saturday, March 10, 14:30

Final
Sunday, March 11, 16:30

Statistics

Top 5 player percentages
Round Robin only

Playdowns

Alberta
The 2007 Alberta Kia Cup was held February 5–11 at the Drayton Valley Arena in Drayton Valley.

Quarter-finals: Ferbey 7-4 Bakker; Koe 9-7 Walchuk 
A1 vs B1: Martin 14-2 Ginter 
A2 vs B2: Koe 6-3 Ferbey 
Semi-final: Koe 6-3 Ginter 
Final: Martin 9-7 Koe

British Columbia
The 2007 BC Men's Provincial Curling Championship was held February 6–11 at the George Preston Recreation Centre in Langley.

Final: Joanisse 8-6 McAulay

Manitoba
The 2007 Safeway Championship was held February 7–11 at Credit Union Place in Dauphin. The tournament was a double-knock out with a page playoff.

New Brunswick
The 2007 New Brunswick Labatt Tankard was held February 7–11 at Curling Beauséjour Inc. in Moncton.

3 vs. 4: Kennedy 4-3 Perron 
Semi-final: Howard 4-2 Kennedy 
Final: Dobson 9-6 Howard

Newfoundland and Labrador
The 2007 Newfoundland and Labrador Provincial Men's Championship was held February 6–11 at the Gander Curling Club in Gander.

Tiebreaker: Peddigrew 8-7 Cunningham; Skanes 9-3 Peddigrew 
Semi-final: Skanes 9-4 Rowsell 
Final: Gushue 8-4 Skanes

Northern Ontario
The 2007 Dominion of Canada Northern Ontario Men's Curling Championship was held February 5–11 at the Idylwylde Golf and Country Club in Sudbury.

1 vs. 2: Phillips 8-7 Harnden 
3 vs. 4: Zechner 7-5 Fawcett 
Semi-final: Harnden 8-1 Zechner 
Final: Harnden 14-6 Phillips

Nova Scotia
The 2007 Alexander Keith's Tankard was played February 7–11 at the Halifax Curling Club in Halifax. The tournament format was triple knock-out with a page playoff.

Ontario
The 2007 TSC Stores Tankard was held February 12–18 at the Sarnia Sports and Entertainment Centre in Sarnia.

1 vs. 2: Howard 9-2 Middaugh 
3 vs. 4: Epping 12-8 Balsdon 
Semi-final: Middaugh 9-5 Epping 
Final: Howard 9 - 5 Middaugh

Prince Edward Island
The 2007 PEI Labatt Tankard was held February 6–11 at the Cornwall Curling Club in Cornwall.

1 vs. 2: Gallant 6-3 Likely 
3 vs. 4: MacDonald 6-4 Stevenson 
Semi-final: MacDonald 9-8 Likely 
Final: Gallant 8-6 MacDonald

Quebec
The 2007 Quebec Men's Provincial Championship was held February 7–13 at the Colisée Cardin in Sorel-Tracy.

A2 vs. B3: Gagné 9-7 D. Fowler 
B2 vs. A3: Desjardins 5-3 Dupuis 
A1 vs. B1: Charette 8-5 Ménard 
Quarter-final: Desjardins 6-5 Gagné 
Semi-final: Ménard 9-8 Desjardins 
Final: Charette 12-8 Ménard

Saskatchewan
The 2007 SaskTel Provincial Men's Tankard was held February 7–11 at the Humboldt Arena in Humboldt. The event was  a triple knock out with a page playoff.

Yukon / Northwest Territories
The Yukon / Northwest Territories Men's Championship was held February 8–11 at the Yellowknife Curling Club in Yellowknife.

References

See also
Final on YouTube

The Brier
Tim Hortons Brier
Sports competitions in Hamilton, Ontario
Curling in Ontario
2007 in Ontario
21st century in Hamilton, Ontario